The Galeão 8 FG Guanabara, was a Brazilian low-wing, single-engined experimental airplane intend to be an executive aircraft to the Brazilian Air Force.

Design and development
The Guanabara was based on the Fokker S.12 training aircraft, then manufactured at Fokker's factory in Brazil. It was proposed by technicians from the Ministry of Aeronautics. The main differences were the little retractable landing gear, newly designed canopy cabin, and additional fuel tanks at the wingtips.

The prototype was ready in April 1965, and flight testing began shortly thereafter. It proved to be very interesting, but problems included the limited passenger capacity and the complicated forward-proof contraction mechanism. This problem made engine maintenance more complicated. The prototype was abandoned, and sent to São José dos Campos, and stored at Department of Aerospace Science and Technology for a few months. 

Later the same year, it was modified by Brazilian Air Force engineers, and new tests were performed, in which it was successful. However, it was again abandoned and scrapped.

Specifications

See also

 Neiva Regente
 Neiva Universal
 Weber W-151

Notes

References

Abandoned civil aircraft projects
Single-engined tractor aircraft
1960s Brazilian civil aircraft
1960s Brazilian experimental aircraft
Aircraft first flown in 1965